The Grand Désert is a 2 km long glacier (2005) situated on the Rosablanche in the Pennine Alps in the canton of Valais in Switzerland. In 1973 it had an area of 1.89 km2. The lake feeds Lac du Grand Désert.

See also
List of glaciers in Switzerland
Swiss Alps

External links
Swiss glacier monitoring network

Glaciers of Valais